Zygaena separata   is a species of moth in the Zygaenidae family. It is found in Southern Fergana ( Uzbekistan). Zygaena separata was described as ab. separata Stgr. of fraxini . It differs in that the distal spots are narrowly but distinctly separated from one another.

References

External links
Images representing Zygaena separata at Bold

Moths described in 1887
Zygaena